Withee is a village in Clark County in the U.S. state of Wisconsin. The population was 487 at the 2010 census. The village is located mostly within the Town of Hixon, with a small portion extending south into the Town of Longwood.

History
Withee was founded in 1870 and named after Niram Withee, a Maine schoolteacher and Wisconsin politician.  It became an incorporated village in 1901, and was the principal shipping point for D.J. Spaulding Mills through the Soo Line Railroad.

In 1893, drawn by Spaulding Company's offer of land for a church, a Danish Lutheran minister from Chicago, a follower of Grundtvig, moved with a few families into the town of Hixon north of Withee to form a Danish community and church.  Other Danes joined them from around the state and by 1896 the congregation included thirty families.  The Danish language was spoken and in 1913 the community even hired a teacher of Danish folk-dancing and gymnastics.  Gradually the Danish community blended with the surrounding English speakers, but Nazareth Lutheran church remains.

Electricity became available in the village in 1902, provided by the Paul A. Paulsen mill. For most outside the village, it took another 35 years, with  electric lines finally put up around 1937 by the new Clark Electric Cooperative, funded by a loan from the New Deal Rural Electrification Administration.

Today Withee is largely a farming community located one mile from the town of Owen. Although the Village of Withee and the City of Owen are separate municipalities, they operate and communicate as one large community, even sharing the same elementary and high school, the Owen-Withee school district.

Geography
Withee is located at  (44.955168, -90.598908).

Demographics

2010 census
As of the census of 2010, there were 487 people, 232 households, and 131 families living in the village. The racial makeup of the village was 99.0% White, 0.2% Native American, 0.2% Asian, and 0.6% from two or more races. Hispanic or Latino of any race were 2.3% of the population.

There were 232 households, of which 23.3% had children under the age of 18 living with them, 41.8% were married couples living together, 9.1% had a female householder with no husband present, 5.6% had a male householder with no wife present, and 43.5% were non-families. 37.1% of all households were made up of individuals, and 16.8% had someone living alone who was 65 years of age or older. The average household size was 2.10 and the average family size was 2.76.

The median age in the village was 45.5 years. 21.1% of residents were under the age of 18; 4.2% were between the ages of 18 and 24; 23.9% were from 25 to 44; 31.4% were from 45 to 64; and 19.5% were 65 years of age or older. The gender makeup of the village was 49.3% male and 50.7% female.

2000 census
As of the census of 2000, there were 507 people, 213 households, and 142 families living in the village. The population density was 606.2 people per square mile (233.5/km2). There were 228 housing units at an average density of 272.1 per square mile (104.8/km2). The racial makeup of the village was 98.43% White, 0.39% Native American, 0.20% Asian, 0.20% from other races, and 0.79% from two or more races. 0.39% of the population were Hispanic or Latino of any race.

There were 213 households, out of which 28.6% had children under the age of 18 living with them, 51.6% were married couples living together, 11.3% had a female householder with no husband present, and 33.3% were non-families. 29.6% of all households were made up of individuals, and 18.8% had someone living alone who was 65 years of age or older. The average household size was 2.36 and the average family size was 2.89.

In the village, the population was spread out, with 24.0% under the age of 18, 5.9% from 18 to 24, 28.5% from 25 to 44, 21.1% from 45 to 64, and 20.5% who were 65 years of age or older. The median age was 40 years. For every 100 females, there were 94.6 males. For every 100 females age 18 and over, there were 85.6 males.

The median income for a household in the village was $29,625, and the median income for a family was $38,542. Males had a median income of $31,250 versus $21,250 for females. The per capita income for the village was $18,874. About 3.8% of families and 6.8% of the population were below the poverty line, including 15.2% of those under age 18 and 9.5% of those age 65 or over.

Notable people
Bruce F. Beilfuss, Chief Justice of the Wisconsin Supreme Court

References

External links
 Village of Withee official website
 Withee Public Library

Villages in Wisconsin
Villages in Clark County, Wisconsin